The  (lit. "customs officers") were a special military force created by Tomás de Zumalacárregui during the First Carlist War.  They were entrusted with the levying of revenue for various consumer goods.  During the first years of the war, they prohibited the export and import of goods to isolated barracks and fortified villages that had sided with the Liberal (Isabeline) cause.      

Their weapons included a bandolier and carbine. 

Mariano José de Larra wrote a satirical article about them called  ("No one can pass without speaking first with the doorman").

Sources 
 Álbum de las tropas carlistas del ejército del norte. Madrid, sin fecha. (184?)
 Juan Antonio Zaratiegui. Vida y hechos de don Tomás de Zumalacárregui. San Sebastián, 1946.
 C.F. Henningsen. Campaña de doce meses en Navarra y las Provincias Vascongadas con el General Zumalacárregui. Madrid 1935
 Diario de Guerra del Teniente General D. José Ignacio de Uranga. (1834-1838). San Sebastián 1959.

First Carlist War
Military units and formations of Spain
Military history of Spain
Carlism
Year of establishment missing
Year of disestablishment missing
Military units and formations established in the 1830s
Military units and formations disestablished in the 1830s
1830s establishments in Spain
1830s disestablishments in Spain